Qalat (also Romanized as Qalāt; also known as Qalātān) is a village in Almahdi Rural District, Mohammadyar District, Naqadeh County, West Azerbaijan Province, Iran. At the 2006 census, its population was 171, in 30 families.

References 

Populated places in Naqadeh County